The 5th Texas Cavalry Regiment or 5th Texas Mounted Rifles was a unit of mounted volunteers from Texas that fought in the Confederate States Army during the American Civil War. The unit was organized at San Antonio in August 1861 for the purpose of invading New Mexico Territory. In 1862, the unit participated in the ultimately unsuccessful New Mexico Campaign. In 1863, the regiment fought at Galveston, Fort Bisland, Irish Bend, Second Donaldsonville, and Sterling's Plantation. In 1864, the unit was in action during the Red River Campaign. After being withdrawn to Texas, the regiment disbanded by June 1865.

See also
List of Texas Civil War Confederate units

References

Units and formations of the Confederate States Army from Texas
1861 establishments in Texas
1865 disestablishments in Texas
Military units and formations disestablished in 1865
Military units and formations established in 1861